Shalom H. Schwartz is a social psychologist, cross-cultural researcher and creator of the Theory of Basic Human Values (universal values as latent motivations and needs). He also contributed to the formulation of the values scale in the context of social learning theory and social cognitive theory.

Biography

After completing his master's degree in social psychology and group development at Columbia University and completing his rabbinical studies, Schwartz received his Ph.D. in social psychology from the University of Michigan, and subsequently taught in the sociology department of the University of Wisconsin–Madison, and in 1973 became a professor. From 1971-73, Schwartz was a visiting lecturer in the department of psychology at the Hebrew University.
In 1979, Schwartz moved to Israel with his wife and three children. He joined the department of psychology at the Hebrew University, where he holds the post of Leon and Clara Sznajderman Professor Emeritus of Psychology. He is now retired, but continues his research activity, as well as developing and promoting his Basic Human Values Theory.

During the 1970s and 1980s, Schwartz was following the studies of Geert Hofstede about human values and built upon them in his research on pro-social and altruistic behavior. His research has since included studies on the development and consequences of a range of behavioral attitudes and orientations, such as religious belief, political orientation and voting, social group relations, consumer behavior, as well as the conceptualization of human values across cultures.

Schwartz is a fellow of the American Psychological Foundation and is a member of the American Sociological Foundation, European Association of Experimental Social Psychology, the Israel Psychological Association, the Society for Experimental Social Psychology, and the Society for Personality and Social Psychology. He is president of the International Association for Cross-Cultural Psychology. He coordinates an international project in more than 70 countries that studies the antecedents and consequences of individual differences in value priorities and the relations of cultural dimensions of values to societal characteristics and policies. His value theory and instruments are part of the ongoing, biannual European Social Survey.

Awards
 In 2007, Schwartz was awarded the Israel Prize in psychology.

Main publications
Schwartz, S. H. and Bilsky, W. (1990). Toward a theory of the universal content and structure of values: Extensions and cross cultural replications. Journal of Personality and Social Psychology, 58, 878-891.
Schwartz, S. H. (1992). Universals in the content and structure of values: Theoretical advances and empirical tests in 20 countries. In M. Zanna (Ed.), Advances in experimental social psychology (Vol. 25) (pp. 1–65). New York: Academic Press.
Schwartz, S. H. (1994). Are there universal aspects in the content and structure of values? Journal of Social Issues, 50, 19-45.
Schwartz, S. H. (1996). Value priorities and behavior: Applying of theory of integrated value systems. In C. Seligman, J. M. Olson, & M. P. Zanna (Eds.), The Psychology of Values: The Ontario Symposium, Vol. 8 (pp. 1–24). Hillsdale, NJ: Erlbaum.
Schwartz, S. H. and Bardi, A. (1997), ‘Influences of adaptation to communist rule on value priorities in Eastern Europe’, Political Psychology, 18, pp. 385–410.
Schwartz, S. H., Lehmann, A., and Roccas, S. (1999), ‘Multimethod probes of basic human values’, in: J. Adamopoulos and Y. Kashima, (eds.), Social Psychology and Culture Context: Essays in Honor of Harry C. Triandis Newbury Park, CA: Sage.
Schwartz, S. H. and Bardi, A. (2000). Moral dialogue across cultures: An empirical perspective. In E. W. Lehman (Ed.), Autonomy and order: A communitarian anthology. Lanham, MD: Rowman & Littlefield.
Schwartz, S. H., Melech, G., Lehmann, A., Burgess, S., and Harris, M. (2001), ‘Extending the cross-cultural validity of the theory of basic human values with a different method of measurement’, Journal of Cross-Cultural Psychology, 32, pp. 519–542.
Schwartz, S. H. A proposal for measuring value orientations across nations in ESS 
Schwartz, S. H. and Boehnke, K. (2004), ‘Evaluating the structure of human values with confirmatory factor analysis’, Journal of Research in Personality, 38, pp. 230–255.
Schwartz, S. H., and Rubel, T. (2005), Sex differences in value priorities: Cross-cultural and multi-method studies. Journal of Personality and Social Psychology, 89, pp. 1010–1028.
Schwartz, S. H. (2006). Value orientations: Measurement, antecedents and consequences across nations. In R. Jowell, C. Roberts, R. Fitzgerald, & G. Eva (Eds.), Measuring attitudes cross-nationally - lessons from the European Social Survey. London: Sage.
Schwartz, S. H., Cieciuch, J., Vecchione, M., Davidov, E., Fischer, R., Beierlein, C., ... and Dirilen-Gumus, O. (2012). Refining the theory of basic individual values. Journal of Personality and Social Psychology, 103, pp. 663-688.

Literature on Shalom Schwartz

See also
List of Israel Prize recipients

References

Cross-cultural psychology
Year of birth missing (living people)
Living people
Teachers College, Columbia University alumni
University of Michigan alumni
Social psychologists
Israeli psychologists
Academic staff of the Hebrew University of Jerusalem
Israel Prize in psychology recipients
Jewish social scientists